Øyvind Torseter (born 2 October 1972) is a Norwegian artist, illustrator, comic book artist and writer. For his lasting contribution as a children's illustrator, Torseter was a finalist in 2014 for the biennial, international Hans Christian Andersen Award, the highest recognition available to creators of children's books.

Biography

Torseter has qualifications in illustration from Merkantilt Institutt in Oslo (1991–1992), Skolen for Grafisk Design in Oslo (1992–1994) and Kent Institute of Art and Design in Maidstone (1995–1998). He has illustrated many picture books, including the prize-winning Klikk (2004), which he also wrote.

Torseter works with both traditional and digital picture techniques. He also experiments with graphic effects and three-dimensional paper clips. The pictures in his books can be illustrations to the text, but also play and experiment with free drawings which contain details and stories with opportunities for exploration. Torseter is one of Norway's foremost illustrators and artists.

Øyvind Torseter lives and works in Oslo.

Books
As writer and illustrator
 2002: Mister Random
 2004: On the road again, again
 2004: Klikk
 2005: For en neve havre
 2007: Avstikkere
 2009: Gravenstein

As illustrator
 1999: Tor Arve Røssland: Pode – children's book
 1999: Finn Øglænd: Vers på tvers. Dikt og tekster for barn
 2000: Tor Arve Røssland: Pode mister fotfestet
 2002: Tor Arve Røssland: Pode får snue
 2002: Bjørn Sortland: Plutselig ville eg ikkje laga dorulldyr lenger
 2006: Roald Kaldestad: Englefjell
 2006: Tor Arve Røssland: Anti-Pode
 2006: Bjørn Sortland: Den gongen eg liksom-døydde
 2007: Radiorådet. Radiorådet : din redningsbøye på livets stormfulle hav
 2008: Stein Erik Lunde: Eg kan ikkje sove no
 2009: Jon Fosse: Spelejenta

Literary and other prizes 
 Kultur- og kirkedepartementets illustrasjonspris for barne- og ungdomslitteratur 1999, for Pode (author Tor Arve Røssland)
 Sproingprisen (Beste nykommer) 2004, for Samlivstrøbbel og sirkus (together with Bjørn Sortland)
 Kultur- og kirkedepartementets billedbokpris for barne- og ungdomslitteratur 2004, for Klikk
 Bologna Ragazzi Award 2008, for Avstikkere
 Kultur- og kirkedepartementets illustrasjonspris for barne- og ungdomslitteratur 2007, for Klar ferdig gå! (authors Beate Grimsrud and Inger Alfvén)
 Kirke- og undervisningsdepartementets billedbokpris 2008, for Eg kan ikkje sove no (together with Stein Erik Lunde)

See also

References

External links
 

1972 births
Living people
Norwegian artists
Norwegian illustrators
Norwegian children's book illustrators
Norwegian graphic designers
Place of birth missing (living people)